Nathan Joseph Baxter (born 8 November 1998) is an English professional footballer who plays as a goalkeeper for Hull City, on loan from  club Chelsea.

Club career
Born in Westminster, Baxter began his career with Cray Wanderers. He then joined Chelsea at the age of 8. In the 2015–16 season he won the FA Youth Cup and the UEFA Youth League.

In August 2016 he moved on loan to Isthmian League side Metropolitan Police on a short-term deal until January 2017. He spent four months at the club, making 19 appearances, before returning to Chelsea in January 2017.

He then joined National League side Solihull Moors on loan for the remainder of the 2016–17 campaign. On 21 January 2017, he made his Solihull debut, keeping a clean sheet during their 0–0 draw with Boreham Wood. He made three clean sheets in his first four games for the club. Baxter went onto appear 17 appearances in total for the club.

On 21 June 2017, Baxter joined fellow National League side Woking on a season-long loan. On the opening day of the campaign, Baxter went onto make his Woking debut as they recorded a 2–1 home victory over Gateshead. Baxter went on to make 48 appearances in total for the club. During the 2017–18 season, Baxter played more minutes (4320) than any other Chelsea loanee.

On 26 June 2018, Baxter agreed to join League Two side Yeovil Town on a season-long loan. Baxter made his Football League debut in their opening day of the season, in a 1–0 away defeat against Bury. At Yeovil, he did not concede a goal for 10 hours 12 minutes, and set a club record after keeping 6 consecutive clean sheets in all competitions.

As of 5 November 2018, he was the "only teenage goalkeeper currently in English football's professional ranks to have racked up over 100 appearances in the senior game".

Baxter made 38 appearances for Yeovil during his season with the club, and won 5 awards at the club's end of season awards, all in the 'Player of the Season' and 'Young Player of the Season' categories.

On 19 June 2019, Baxter joined Scottish Premiership side Ross County on a season long loan. He suffered a shoulder injury early in the season before returning to first-team action, and went on to play in 14 games in a row.

On 9 October 2020, Baxter joined Accrington Stanley on loan.

On 25 June 2021, he moved on loan to Hull City for the season. Baxter made his league debut on 6 November 2021, in a 2–0 victory over Barnsley at Oakwell and was later selected in the Championship’s team of the week following an impressing showing on his first league start. He went on to make 18 appearances for the club, including 7 clean sheets in his 16 league matches and having the highest save percentage in the Championship at 79.5 percent.

On 4 July 2022, Baxter returned to Hull City for a second season-long loan spell.

Career statistics

Personal life
Baxter has stated that Petr Čech was his inspiration.

Honours
Chelsea Youth
FA Youth Cup: 2015–16
UEFA Youth League: 2015–16

References

External links

Profile at the Yeovil Town F.C. website

1998 births
Living people
Footballers from Westminster
English footballers
Association football goalkeepers
Cray Wanderers F.C. players
Chelsea F.C. players
Metropolitan Police F.C. players
Solihull Moors F.C. players
Woking F.C. players
Yeovil Town F.C. players
Ross County F.C. players
Accrington Stanley F.C. players
Hull City A.F.C. players
Isthmian League players
National League (English football) players
English Football League players
Scottish Professional Football League players